The administrative arrondissement of Brussels-Capital, which corresponds to the Brussels-Capital Region, serves as a parliamentary constituency in Belgium for the election of the Chamber of Representatives since 2014.

The constituencies for the Chamber of Representatives are set by Article 87 of the Electoral Code of 1894. The constituency of Brussels-Capital was created by modification of 19 July 2012 as part of the sixth Belgian state reform, splitting the Brussels-Halle-Vilvoorde constituency.

As Brussels is an officially bilingual area, members elected in this constituency are the only ones who may choose which parliamentary language group they belong to – Dutch or French. In practice, no Flemish party receives enough votes to have any elected members, so all 15 members are French-speaking.

Representatives

References

Constituencies of the Chamber of Representatives (Belgium)